Monica K. Lindstrom is an attorney and legal analyst who has served as a criminal prosecutor, as well as practicing in the areas of criminal defense, complex civil litigation and general civil litigation, as well as making frequent media appearances to comment on court cases in the news. She is based in Scottsdale, Arizona.

Education and legal career

Lindstrom attended Northern Arizona University, where she earned her B.S., moving on to earn her Juris Doctor through California Western School of Law. She first served as a criminal prosecutor for the Maricopa County Attorney's Office in Phoenix. Following this, she entered into private practice as an attorney, ultimately starting her own practice, MKLindstrom Law, PLLC.

She is married to author, relationship/communication coach and professional speaker Michael J. Lindstrom.

Legal commentary in the media

Lindstrom is a legal analyst providing legal commentary to the media for higher profile court cases, including the trials of Warren Jeffs, O. J. Simpson, Phil Spector, Dr. Conrad Murray, James Ray, and Casey Anthony. Following the crash of Flight 1549, she appeared on Fox News discussing the rights of the passengers. She has also appeared on Fox News discussing Robert Benjo and the topic of mercy killing, document preservation in the Bernie Madoff case, the rights of illegal immigrants and prayer in schools. She has appeared on Lou Dobbs, The Pat McMahon Show and The Jay Lawrence Show, and is a regular on the Mac and Gaydos show, (all on KTAR in Arizona), discussing court cases in the news.

She served as a legal expert for several media outlets during the Jodi Arias trial. During the trial, she appeared on Geraldo At Large, The O'Reilly Factor and KTAR. She also discussed the case on Jane Velez-Mitchell and Nancy Grace. Outside of broadcasting, she spoke about the topic of sensationalism in the media as it related to Arias and other high-profile cases. She was a member of the Jodi Arias Defense Team on the HLN talk show HLN After Dark: The Jodi Arias Trial. A show started during the Jodi Arias Trial, HLN After Dark conducted a mock trial of Arias, gathering a "live studio jury" to discuss aspects of the case each night, with the jurors holding up cards reading "guilty" or "not guilty" at the end of the show. The show, intended to just last the duration of the case, is now a member of the channel's nightly lineup. Lindstrom continues to appear regularly on HLN, on HLN News Now, HLN After Dark, Making it in America (now called Now In America), and HLN Evening Express.

Lindstrom has also appeared on CNN, discussing the Jodi Arias trial, as well as the Ariel Castro Trial.

Volunteering

She currently serves as a Judge pro tempore with the Maricopa County Superior Court in the civil, criminal and family divisions. She served as a member of the City of Scottsdale Board of Adjustments for a six-year term. She also volunteers with the Scottsdale Bar Association, where she is currently vice president.

References

External links
MKLindstrom Law, PLLC
Scottsdale Mama - Lindstrom's Personal Blog

Living people
Northern Arizona University alumni
California Western School of Law alumni
Year of birth missing (living people)
People from Scottsdale, Arizona